A palate cleanser is a serving of food or drink that removes food residue from the tongue allowing one to more accurately assess a new flavor.

Palate cleansers are often used between tasting wine or cheese or other strong flavors. Pickled ginger is used as a palate cleanser between sushi pieces.

Traditional French palate cleansers include sorbet, bread, apple slices, parsley and mint. 

Bamia is a traditional Anatolian stew that is sometimes served as a palate cleanser between food courses at ceremonial feasts.

References

External links
 What Foods Cleanse the Palate 
 Orange Sorbet - A Palate Cleanser

Taste modifiers